The discography of Elliott Smith, an American singer-songwriter, consists of six studio albums, one live album, two compilation albums and eleven singles.

Albums

Studio albums

Posthumous studio albums

Live albums

Compilation albums

Promotional compilations

Singles

Retail singles

Posthumous singles

Promotional singles

Split singles

Music videos

Contributions

Soundtrack inclusions 
 Lucky Three (1997) – "Baby Britain" (instrumental), "Between the Bars" (live), "Thirteen" (live Big Star cover), "Angeles" (live)
 The Maker (1997) – "Ballad of Big Nothing", "Cupid's Trick"
 Good Will Hunting (1997) – "Miss Misery", "Between the Bars" (orchestral version), "No Name #3", "Angeles", "Say Yes"
 Hurricane Streets (1997) – "Say Yes"
 Strange Parallel (1998) – Various studio and live versions of Smith's songs; also features his covers of George Harrison's "Isn't It a Pity" and Sergei Rachmaninoff's "Prelude Op3 #2 in C Sharp Minor", and a dub cover of "Waltz #2 (XO)" performed by Future Pigeon
 American Beauty (1999) – "Because" (Beatles cover)
 Opposite Sex (2000) (Season 1, Episode 1: "Pilot") – "Say Yes"
 Opposite Sex (2000) (Season 1, Episode 2: "The Virgin Episode") – "The Biggest Lie"
 Keeping the Faith (2000) – "Pitseleh"
 Antitrust (2001) – "Son of Sam"
 The Royal Tenenbaums (2001) – "Needle in the Hay"
 Southlander (2001) – "Splitsville", "Snowbunny's Serenade" (an alternate version of "Bye", from Figure 8)
 Ora o mai più (Now or Never) (2003) – "Say Yes"
 One Tree Hill (2003) (Season 1, Episode 7: "Life in a Glass House") – "Say Yes"
 The Girl Next Door (2004) – "Angeles"
 Thumbsucker (2005) – "Let's Get Lost", "Trouble" (Cat Stevens cover), "Thirteen" (Big Star cover, originally in Lucky Three)
 The O.C. (2005) (Season 2, Episode 7: "Family Ties") – "Twilight"
 The O.C. (2005) (Season 2, Episode 10: "The Accomplice") – "Pretty (Ugly Before)"
 Cold Case (2005) (Season 2, Episode 16: "Revenge") – "Waltz #2 (XO)"
 One Tree Hill (2006) (Season 3, Episode 22: "The Show Must Go On") – "Say Yes"
 CSI: NY (2006) (Season 2, Episode 24: "Charge of This Post") – "Angeles"
 Criminal Minds (2006) (Season 2, Episode 5: "The Aftermath") – "Clementine"
 Ha-Shminiya (2006) (Season 2, Episode 8: "Matisse's Moroccans") – "Pretty Mary K"
 Die Österreichische Methode (2006) – "Tomorrow Tomorrow"
 Georgia Rule (2007) – "I Don't Think I'm Ever Gonna Figure It Out"
 Heroes (2007) (Season 1, Episode 23: "How to Stop an Exploding Man") – "The Last Hour"
 Gossip Girl (2007) (Season 1, Episode 7: "Victor/Victrola") – "Whatever (Folk Song in C)"
 The Go-Getter (2007) – "Coast to Coast"
 Paranoid Park (2007) – "Angeles", "The White Lady Loves You More"
 Life (2008) (Season 2, Episode 16: "Crushed") – "Pretty (Ugly Before)"
 Skins (2008) (Season 2, Episode 10: "Everyone") – "Between the Bars"
 Guitar Hero 5 (2009) – "L.A."
 Up in the Air (2009) – "Angel in the Snow"
 American Pie Presents: The Book of Love (2009) – "Say Yes"
 Fresh Meat (2011) (Series 1: Episode 1) – "Waltz #2"
 True Blood (2012) (Season 5, Episode 8: "Somebody That I Used to Know") – "Somebody That I Used to Know"
 Stuck in Love (2012) – "Between the Bars"
 Love, Rosie (2014) – "Son of Sam"
 Rick and Morty (2015) (Season 2, Episode 7: "Big Trouble in Little Sanchez") – "Between the Bars"
 13 Reasons Why (2017) (Season 1, Episode 5) – "Thirteen"
 Mr. Robot (2017) (Season 3, Episode 4) – "Everything Means Nothing to Me"
 The Sunlit Night (2019) – "Pretty (Ugly Before)"
 Normal People (2020) (Season 1, Episode 2) – "Angeles"

Compilation inclusions 

 So, What Else Do You Do? (1994) – "Roman Candle"
 A Slice of Lemon (1995) – "Big Decision"
 American Pie, Vol. 2: I Can't Hear You (Again) (1996) – "Roman Candle"
 Some Songs: From the Kill Rock Stars Singles (1997) – "Some Song"
 To All the URLs I've Loved Before (1997) – "Some (Rock) Song"
 Un Eté 97 (1997) – "Speed Trials"
 CMJ New Music Monthly, Vol. 44 (1997) – "Rose Parade"
 Chill Out With the Class of '97 (1997) – "Say Yes"
 CMJ New Music Monthly, Vol. 61 (1998) – "Waltz #2 (XO)"
 Virtually Alternative September 98 (1998) – "Waltz #2 (XO)"
 Select Magazine: Hot! (1998) – "Ballad of Big Nothing"
 Vive La Différence – Nouveautés Domino 98/99 (1998) – "Speed Trials"
 Rare Trax Vol. 8 – Unerhört! Die Heimlichen Hits Von 98 (1998) – "Division Day"
 Virtually Alternative October 98 (1998) – "Waltz #2 (XO)"
 Musician Magazine's A Little on the CD Side Volume 31 (1998) – "Waltz #2 (XO)"
 Screenadelica (Hot Sounds from Cool Movies) (1998) – "Miss Misery"
 Rolling Stone New Voices Vol. 23 (1998) – "Pictures of Me"
 Universal Music CD Sampler 1998 #5 (1998) – "Waltz #2 (XO)"
 EMI Hit Disc 105 – Album CD Sampler Information May '98 (1998) – "Between the Bars"
 New Music Spins 9 (1998) – "Waltz #2 (XO)", "Independence Day", and "Baby Britain"
 Good Will Hunting Sampler (1998) – "Between the Bars" and "Miss Misery"
 Universal Ser Fremover Vol. 7 (1998) – "Waltz #2 (XO)"
 Air Check (1998) – "See You Later" (Heatmiser cover)
 Humo – Alle 98 Goed (1998) – "Waltz #2"
 Unconditionally Guaranteed (The Coolest Sounds from the Hottest Bands of 1998) (1998) – "Between the Bars"
 Wicked Good Sampler 05 (1998) – "Waltz #2"
 Une Rentrée 98 (1998) – "Waltz #2"
 Virtually Alternative December 98, V. 99 (1998) – "Baby Britain"
 Radioactive Top 40 & Alternative Series No. 02 (May 1998) (1998) – "Miss Misery" (Radio Edit)
 Howlin' Kitty promo (1998) – "Independence Day"
 Habits of the Heart (1998) – "Sweet Adeline"
 Drinking From Puddles: A Radio History (1999) – "Everybody Cares, Everybody Understands" (live at KBVR)
 YoYo a Go Go '97: Another Live Compilation (1998) – "Rose Parade" (live)
 NME Annual Probe, Vol. 2 (1999) – "Pictures of Me"
 Chivas Regal (1999) – "Waltz #1"
 8 trax plus 2 promo (1999) – "Baby Britain"
 Virtuallyalternative 100 (January '99) (1999) – "Baby Britain"
 All Is Full of Love (1999) – "Waltz #2 (XO)"
 American Eagle Outfitters: The Blue Album, Vol. 2 (1998) – "Waltz #2 (XO)"
 A Little on the CD Side, Vol. 31 (1998) – "Waltz #2 (XO)"
 Network 40: CD Tuneup 109 (1998) – "Miss Misery"
 Liberation! HMV Exclusive Sampler (1998) – "Independence Day"
 WBCN 3:16 (1999) – "Baby Britain"
 Back to School domestic sampler promo (1999) – "Our Thing"
 OUI Radiorock Volume 01 (2000) – "Son of Sam"
 CMJ New Music Monthly Volume 81 May 2000 (2000) – "Son of Sam"
 Objectif 2000 – Tome 2 (2000) – "Happiness/The Gondola Man"
 DreamWorks Fall sampler promo (2000) – "A Living Will"
 Sweet & Pungent Dreamworks sampler (2000) – "Son of Sam"
 WFUV New Names New Music (2000) – "Son of Sam"
 Cavity Search Records Audio Resume (2000) – "Condor Ave."
 WXPN 88.5 FM New Names New Music (2000) – "Son of Sam"
 FMQB MQB Modern Rock on the Dial: An FMQB CD Sampler March 2000 Promo (2000) – "Son of Sam"
 Indie 2000 Volume 5 (2000) – "Waltz #2"
 TapeOp: A Compact Disc of Creative Music Recordings (2000) – "Waltz #1" (demo)
 Romantic Collection 2000 Harmony (2000) – "Because" (Beatles cover)
 Monitor This! (2000) – "Son of Sam"
 the deep end (2000) – "Happiness" (edit)
 Yeti: Volume I (2000) – "Angel in the Snow"
 Filthy Festival Fun: A Polydor New Release Sampler (2000) – "Wouldn't Mama Be Proud?"
 LAUNCH (Launch Media CD-ROM) (2000) – "Son of Sam", "Somebody That I Used to Know", "Happiness"
 Open All Night: In the City (2001) – "Miss Misery"
 Rokkland Rás 2 (2001) – "Waltz #2 (XO)"
 Magnet New Music Sampler Volume 27 (2002) – "Summertime" [Goldenboy feat. Elliott Smith]
 The Amos House Collection, Volume II (2002) – "Bottle Up and Explode!" (early version)
 Worlds of Possibility: Domino's 10th Anniversary (2003) – "Speed Trials"
 Worlds Of Possibility sampler (2003) – "Speed Trials"
 Music Inspired by Bumbershoot (2003) – "Pretty (Ugly Before)"
 Triple J's Hottest 100 10th Anniversary – Hottest Box (2003) – "Waltz #2 (XO)"
 Sonically Speaking (Vol 19: Oktober 2004) (2004) – "Twilight"
 Magnet New Music Sampler, Vol. 35 (2004) – "Twilight"
 Declaration of Independence (2004) – "Ballad of Big Nothing"
 Future Soundtrack for America (2004) – "A Distorted Reality Is Now a Necessity to Be Free"
 A Declaration Of Independence – The Sound of Domino (2004) – "Twilight"
 Une Rentrée 2004 – Vol. 2 (2004) – "Twilight"
 Vital Music (2004) – "Pretty (Ugly Before)"
 The Best Soundtrack Vol. 2 MP3 (2004) – "Because" (Beatles cover)
 Paste Magazine (Issue 12) (2004) – "Memory Lane"
 2004 Volume One (15 Tracks from the Year's Best New Albums) (2004) – "Memory Lane"
 Rolling Stone New Noises Vol. 68 (2004) – "A Fond Farewell"
 Sounds – Now! (2004) – "Pretty (Ugly Before)"
 Oorgasm 19 (2004) – "Twilight"
 Word of Mouth 21 (2004) – "Twilight"
 Another Urban Outfitter Sampler (2004) – "Pretty (Ugly Before)"
 The Bands 05 (2004) – "Coast to Coast"
 Alternative Distribution Alliance Fall 2004 Sampler (2004) – "Twilight"
 X-Rock #7 (2004) – "Coast to Coast"
 All Tomorrow's Parties v3.1 (2005) – "Pictures of Me"
 Triple J Hottest 100 v12 (2005) – "Memory Lane"
 Beatles Regrooved (2005) – "Because" (Beatles cover)
 The Best Acoustic Album in the World... Ever! (2005) – "Let's Get Lost"
 Domino – Inverno 2005 (2005) – "Twilight"
 Vital Sales & Marketing Best of 2004/Best of 2005 (2005) – "Pretty (Ugly Before)"
 Acoustico (2005) – "Speed Trials"
 Here Comes the Sun (2005) – "Let's Get Lost"
 Rough Trade Shops – Counter Culture 04 Best of 2004 (2005) – "Let's Get Lost"
 Wide Awake – It's All About Songs (2005) – "Let's Get Lost"
 Everything You Need (2005) – "Twilight"
 Rough Trade Shops: Singer Songwriter (2006) – "Needle in the Hay"
 The Definitive Tom Dunne Vol. 01: Pet Picks 2000–2006 (2006) – "Son of Sam"
 Mellow Gold (2006) – "A Fond Farewell"
 Suicide Squeeze: Slaying Since 1996 (2006) – "Division Day"
 Alternative Acoustic (2006) – "Say Yes"
 2004 (Ein Jahr Und Seine 20 Songs) (2006) – "A Fond Farewell"
 Mo's Songs! (2006) – "Waltz #2 (XO)"
 Late Night Tales: Air (2006) – "Let's Get Lost"
 Panic Prevention Vol. 4 (Jamie T DJ mix) (2006) – "Needle in the Hay"
 Wide Awake 3 – It's All About Songs (2007) – "Angel in the Snow"
 Mojo Presents: Love Will Tear You Apart (2007) – "Twilight"
 Un Printemps 2007 – Vol. 2 (2007) – "High Times"
 Kylie Minogue – Music and Moments (2007) – "Angeles"
 100 Trésors Cachés: Chansons Rares & Indispensables (2007) – "Condor Ave."
 Independent Innovative Creative (2007) – "High Times"
 Under the Milky Way (2007) – "Between the Bars"
 Kulturkantine (Acoustic Lounge: The Singer and Songwriter Session) (2007) – "Angeles"
 Sampler Real Love (2007) – "High Times"
 Mountain Magic: A Kill Rock Stars Collection 1991–2000 (2008) – "Angeles"
 Between the Lines II (2008) – "Son of Sam"
 Asia Argento – Asia Argento (2008) – "Waltz #1"
 100% Bittersweet Melodies (2008) – "Waltz #2"
 Het Beste Van 2 Meter Sessies 1987–2009 (2009) – "Waltz #2"
 Sleeping Beauties (Songs We Shouldn't Forget) (2009) – "Say Yes"
 Jazz Supreme Modal Waltz-a-Nova (2009) – "Waltz #1"
 100 Hits Indie (2009) – "Ballad of Big Nothing"
 Kill Rock Stars Best Sampler Ever (2010) – "Angeles"
 Grandes Canções Do Cinema (2010) – "Miss Misery"
 Paste Magazine New – Music Sampler June 2010 Issue 64 (2010) – "Last Call"
 25 Years Pukkelpop (2010) – "Waltz #2 (XO)"
 Les Inrockuptibles – Best Of 2000–2010 (2010) – "Son of Sam"
 Hit Disc Nov. 2010 (2010) – "Between the Bars"
 Hype Machine Radio Show: April 2010 (2010) – "Twilight"
 20 Years of Kill Rock Stars (2011) – "Between the Bars"
 Live from Nowhere Near You, Vol. 2 (2011) – "The Real Estate"
 L'Anthologie Des InRocks – 25 Ans De Musique (2011) – "Between the Bars"
 Les Beaux Labels (Volume 1) (2011) – "Ballad of Big Nothing"
 Rise & Shine (2012) – "Summertime" [Goldenboy feat. Elliott Smith]
 Keep Portland Weird – City Sound Step 2: Portland (2012) – "Needle in the Hay"
 L'Inrockuptible 2 (Bernard Lenoir DJ mix) (2013) – "Baby Britain"
 Songs We Shouldn't Forget Collected (2013) – "Say Yes"
 Kill Rock Stars: Crazed Fans MP3 Vol. 1 (2014) – "Needle in the Hay" (Trumpet Version)
 Coffret 60 Ans De Musique (2014) – "Speed Trials"
 XPLAYMIX říjen 2014 (Strangers in the City DJ mix) (2014) – "No Name #1"
 100 Hits Indie Anthems (2014) – "Angeles"
 Fort George (2014) – "Division Day"
 Rolling Stone Rare Trax Vol. 84 – Lost & Rare Tracks (2014) – "A Fond Farewell"
 Suicide Squeeze 20 Year Anniversary (2016) – "No Confidence Man"
 Het Allerbeste Uit Radio 1 Classics 1000 (2016) – "Waltz #2 (XO)"
 7-Inches for Planned Parenthood (2017) – "Pretty (Ugly Before)" (Live at Largo)
 Het Allerbeste Uit Radio 1 Classics – 2018 (2018) – "Between the Bars"

Filmography

Unreleased material 

Unreleased tracks, demos, and covers have circulated over the Internet. The posthumous collection From a Basement on a Hill II attracted the attention of the media when it was first leaked online.
Other leaks include the Grand Mal collection, which is updated yearly and, as of the latest edition, contains 131 tracks spread over eight discs, and the two-disc Basement Demos collection, which contains some of the same tracks as From a Basement on a Hill II along with a significant amount of additional unreleased material. Many of these leaks have taken place near the anniversary of Smith's death.

Notes 

 A  Released alongside copies of Elliott Smith by Autumn de Wilde.
 B  Re-released on November 1, 2010, to promote An Introduction to... Elliott Smith.
 C  Re-released on December 6, 2004, as the lead single from From a Basement on the Hill.
 D  Credited as "Leicester Myth" in the album's liner notes.
 E  Will be released as part of the 25th anniversary reissue of Elliott Smith.

References

External links 
 
 

Discographies of American artists
Discography
Alternative rock discographies
Folk music discographies